Edward Richard Shaw (1855–1903) was a Professor and Dean, New York University, and author of numerous books, primarily children's schoolbooks.

Shaw was born in 1855 at Bellport, New York (part of Long Island). His undergraduate work was at Lafayette College, and he received his Ph.D. from New York University. After serving as Principal at Sayville, New York; Greenport, Suffolk County, New York; and Yonkers (NY) High School, he became Professor of Pedagogy in the New York University. By the time of his death, he was Dean.

Some of Shaw's output consisted of famous works edited for use by schoolchildren; examples include Black Beauty and Joshua Slocum's Sailing alone around the world.

Works

Shaw
Edward Richard
The Pot Of Gold
Belford, Clarke and Co.
Chicago IL 
1888

References

External links 

 
 
 

1855 births
1903 deaths
New York University faculty
American children's writers
American education writers
Writers from New York (state)
People from Bellport, New York
People from Sayville, New York
People from Greenport, Suffolk County, New York
People from Yonkers, New York